Thomas Nordish (baptised 25 March 1785 – 1 July 1842) was an English cricketer. He was a wicket-keeper who played for Kent teams in the early 19th century.

Nordish was a farmer and horse dealer who lived at Dodmore Manor Farm, Meopham throughout his life. He was the son of Thomas and Ann Nordish and played club cricket in the Meopham area. He first played for a Kent side in 1805 and played in two matches which are now considered to have first-class cricket status: once in 1815 and once in 1823, opening the batting on both occasions. His highest first-class score of nine runs came in his first innings.

In 1818 Nordish played for an England side against a 22-man Nottingham side in a non-first-class match.

Nordish married Elizabeth Dorrinton in 1827. He died at Meopham in 1842 aged 57.

Notes

References

External links

1785 births
1842 deaths
English cricketers
English cricketers of 1787 to 1825
Kent cricketers
People from Meopham